The Progressive Aerodyne Stingray is an American homebuilt flying boat that was designed by and produced by Progressive Aerodyne of Orlando, Florida, introduced in the 1990s. When it was available the aircraft was supplied as a kit for amateur construction.

Design and development
The Stingray features a strut-braced parasol wing, a single-seat enclosed cockpit under a bubble canopy, retractable conventional landing gear and a single engine in pusher configuration.

The aircraft is made from a combination of metal tubing, with its flying surfaces covered in Dacron sailcloth doped aircraft fabric and a reinforced fiberglass hull. The wing also mounts outrigger pontoons that provide stability on the water.

The manufacturer estimates the construction time from the supplied kit as 350 hours.

Operational history
By 1998 the company reported that five aircraft were completed and flying.

In January 2014 four examples were registered in the United States with the Federal Aviation Administration, although a total of nine had been registered at one time.

Specifications (Stingray)

See also
List of flying boats and floatplanes

References

Stingray
1990s United States sport aircraft
1990s United States ultralight aircraft
1990s United States civil utility aircraft
Single-engined pusher aircraft
Parasol-wing aircraft
Homebuilt aircraft
Amphibious aircraft
Flying boats